Felch may mean:

 Felching, when semen or other fluids are sucked from the anus
 Alpheus Felch (1804–1896), Governor and U.S. Senator from Michigan
 Felch Township, Michigan, named in honor of Alpheus Felch

See also
Felchville (disambiguation)
 Fletch (disambiguation)